Huge Hits 99 is a compilation album released in 1999. As a part of the Hits compilation series, it contains UK hit singles from the third quarter of 1999.

Track listing

Disc one
 Eiffel 65 - "Blue (Da Ba Dee)"
 George Michael - "Outside"
 Lou Bega - "Mambo No. 5"
 Ricky Martin - "Livin' la Vida Loca"
 Britney Spears - "Sometimes"
 S Club 7 - "Bring It All Back"
 Westlife - "Swear It Again"
 Five - "If Ya Gettin' Down"
 Backstreet Boys - "I Want It That Way"
 Steps - "Love's Got a Hold on My Heart"
 Boyzone - "You Needed Me"
 Jamiroquai - "Canned Heat"
 B*Witched - "Blame It on the Weatherman"
 a1 - "Be the First to Believe"
 NSYNC - "I Want You Back"
 Sixpence None the Richer - "Kiss Me"
 The Corrs - "Runaway"
 New Radicals - "You Get What You Give"
 Catatonia - "Dead from the Waist Down"
 Manic Street Preachers - "You Stole the Sun from My Heart"
 Tom Jones & the Cardigans - "Burning Down The House"

Disc two
 Whitney Houston - "My Love Is Your Love"
 Jennifer Lopez - "If You Had My Love"
 Shanks & Bigfoot - "Sweet like Chocolate"
 Will Smith - "Miami"
 ATB - "9 PM (Till I Come)"
 Ann Lee - "2 Times"
 Armand van Helden featuring Duane Harden - "You Don't Know Me"
 Bob Marley vs. Funkstar De Luxe - "Sun Is Shining (Radio De Luxe edit)"
 The Wiseguys - "Ooh La La"
 Phats & Small - "Turn Around"
 Fatboy Slim - "Praise You"
 A.T.F.C. Presents Onephatdeeva - "In and Out of My Life"
 Another Level - "I Want You For Myself"
 Destiny's Child - "Bills, Bills, Bills"
 TQ - "Westside"
 Lauryn Hill - "Ex-Factor"
 Glamma Kid featuring Shola Ama - "Taboo"
 Tatyana Ali - "Boy You Knock Me Out"
 Barenaked Ladies - "One Week"
 Thunderbugs - "Friends Forever"
 Steps, Cleopatra, Tina Cousins, B*Witched and Billie - "Thank ABBA For The Music":
 "Take a Chance on Me"
 "Dancing Queen"
 "Mamma Mia"
 "Thank You For The Music"

External links
 Discogs entry for Huge Hits 99

1999 compilation albums
Hits (compilation series) albums